Javier "Javi" Rubio Haro (born 12 May 1999) is a Spanish footballer who plays as a right back for CD Leganés B.

Club career
Born in Madrid, Rubio finished his formation with Rayo Vallecano. He made his senior debut with the reserves on 29 October 2017, playing the last seven minutes in a 1–0 Tercera División home win against CF San Agustín del Guadalix.

Rubio scored his first senior goal on 24 March 2019, netting the opener in a 2–0 home success over Villaverde San Andrés. In December, after being regularly called up by Paco Jémez to train with the first team, he suffered a knee injury which sidelined him for the remainder of the season.

On 16 September 2020, Rubio signed for CD Leganés, being initially assigned to the reserves also in the fourth division. Four days later he made his professional debut, starting in a 1–2 away loss against CD Lugo in the Segunda División.

References

External links
 
 
 

1999 births
Living people
Footballers from Madrid
Spanish footballers
Association football defenders
Segunda División players
Tercera División players
Rayo Vallecano B players
CD Leganés B players
CD Leganés players